CrazyVideoCool is the second video album from American R&B trio TLC. The collection was released in the US after the release of the video, Diggin' on You in 1995, while in other countries it was released a year later. The compilation includes four complete videos from CrazySexyCool, as well as bonus excerpts from the unreleased versions of Creep, and the uncensored video for Red Light Special. In addition to the video 'Making of's', it also features interviews and live performances. The video peaked #5 in the Billboard Top Music Videos chart.

Track listing

Charts

Certifications and sales

Credits
Credits adapted from the liner notes of CrazyVideoCool.

Recording and management
Contains a sample of "Hey Young World", written by Ricky Walters and performed by Slick Rick, published by Def American Songs, Inc., courtesy of Def Jam Recordings, Inc.
Contains a sample from "Who the Cap Fits", written by Edmund Carl Aiken, Jr. professionally known as Shinehead, and performed by Shinehead, published by African Love Music/Def American Songs, Inc. under license from African Love Music

Personnel
 Bille Woodruff — producer
 Michelle Montgomery — associate producer
 Davett Singletary — executive in charge of production
 Antonio M. Reid — video executive producer
 Kenneth Edmonds — video executive producer
 Jon Marett — audio supervision
 Jon Herron — audio post engineer
 Sandy Lawrence — audio post engineer
 Arnold Turner — photographer
 Matthew Rolston — director

References

1995 compilation albums
1995 video albums
Arista Records compilation albums
Arista Records video albums
LaFace Records compilation albums
Music video compilation albums
TLC (group) video albums